Aagamanam is a 1980 Indian Malayalam film, directed by Jeassy and produced by G. Sugunan. The film stars Sukumari, Srividya, M. G. Soman and Ravikumar in the lead roles. The film has musical score by Vidyadharan.

Cast
 
Sukumari as Subhadra Menon 
Srividya as Thulasi 
M. G. Soman as Venu 
Ravikumar as Raghu 
Adoor Bhasi as Samuel 
Jose Prakash as Isaac 
Manavalan Joseph as Padmanabhan 
Sankaradi as Raman Nair 
Ambika as Seetha 
Janardanan as Murali 
K. P. Ummer as Estate Owner 
T. K. Balachandran as Peter 
Sukumaran as Professor George Thomas

Soundtrack
The music was composed by Vidyadharan and the lyrics were written by O. N. V. Kurup.

References

External links
 

1980 films
1980s Malayalam-language films